The 2016 Latrobe City Traralgon ATP Challenger is a professional tennis tournament played on outdoor hard court. It is the fifth edition of the tournament which was part of the 2016 ATP Challenger Tour. It took place in Traralgon, Australia between 24 and 30 October 2016.

Singles main draw entrants

Seeds

 Rankings are as of 17 October 2016.

Other entrants
The following players received wildcards into the singles main draw:
  Aaron Addison
  Oliver Anderson
  Harrison Lombe
  Darren Polkinghorne

The following players received entry into the singles main draw under a protected ranking:
  Jarmere Jenkins

The following players received entry from the qualifying draw:
  Yoshihito Nishioka
  Gavin van Peperzeel
  Scott Puodziunas
  Brandon Walkin

Champions

Singles

  Jordan Thompson def.  Grega Žemlja, 6–1, 6–2.

Doubles

  Matt Reid /  John-Patrick Smith def.  Matthew Barton /  Matthew Ebden, 6–4, 6–4.

References

External links
 
 ATP official site

Latrobe City Traralgon ATP Challenger
2016 in Australian tennis
October 2016 sports events in Australia